The 1980 Astro Boy series is a color remake of the 1960s anime black-and-white series of the same name; both series are adapted from the manga series of the same name by Osamu Tezuka. The series aired from October 1, 1980, to December 23, 1981. It had a very limited release in the U.S., where broadcasts were limited to syndication in a few markets, such as the Philadelphia-Wilmington area where it aired at 10:30am weekdays in 1986 on what was then WTGI—channel 61.

Episodes

References

Astro Boy
Astro Boy (1980)